Sybrodoius tippmanni is a species of beetle in the family Cerambycidae, and the only species in the genus Sybrodoius. It was described by Breuning in 1957.

References

Desmiphorini
Beetles described in 1957
Monotypic beetle genera